Gordon-Keeble was a British car marque, made first in Slough, then Eastleigh, and finally in Southampton (all in England), between 1964 and 1967. The marque's badge was unusual in featuring a tortoise — a pet tortoise walked into the frame of an inaugural photo-shoot, taken in the grounds of the makers. Because of the irony (the slowness of tortoises) the animal was chosen as the emblem.

Design
The Gordon-Keeble came about when John Gordon, formerly of the struggling Peerless company, and Jim Keeble got together in 1959 to make the Gordon GT car, initially by fitting a Chevrolet Corvette V8 engine, into a chassis by Peerless, for a USAF pilot named Nielsen. Impressed with the concept, a 4.6 litre Chevrolet (283 c.i.) V8 was fitted into a specially designed square-tube steel spaceframe chassis, with independent front suspension and all-round disc brakes. The complete chassis was then taken to Turin, Italy, where a body made of steel panels  designed by Giorgetto Giugiaro was built by Bertone. The car's four five-inch headlights were in the rare, slightly angled "slanted" arrangement also used by a few other European marques, generally for high-speed cars such as Lagonda Rapide, Lancia Flaminia and Triumphs, as well as Rolls-Royce. The interior had an old luxury jet feel, with white on black gauges, toggle switches, and quilted aircraft PVC.

The car appeared on the Bertone stand in March 1960, branded simply as a Gordon, at the Geneva Motor Show.  At that time problems with component deliveries had delayed construction of the prototype, which had accordingly been built at breakneck speed by Bertone in precisely 27 days. After extensive road testing the car was shipped to Detroit and shown to Chevrolet management, who agreed to supply Corvette engines and gearboxes for a production run of the car.

The car was readied for production with some alterations, the main ones being a larger 5.4-litre (327 c.i.)  Chevrolet V8 engine and a change from steel to a glass fibre body made by Williams & Pritchard Limited. Problems with suppliers occurred and before many cars were made the money ran out and the company went into liquidation. About 90 cars had been sold at what turned out to be an unrealistic price of £2798. Each car had two petrol tanks.

In 1965 the company was bought by Harold Smith and Geoffrey West and was re-registered as Keeble Cars Ltd. Production resumed, but only for a short time, the last car of the main manufacturing run being made in 1966. A final example was actually produced in 1967 from spares, bringing the total made to exactly 100. The Gordon-Keeble Owners' Club claim that over 90 examples still exist.
  
An attempt was made to restart production in 1968 when the rights to the car were bought by an American, John de Bruyne, but this came to nothing, although two cars badged as De Bruynes were shown at that year's New York Motor Show along with a new mid-engined coupé.

See also
 List of car manufacturers of the United Kingdom

References

External links

 Gordon-Keeble Club website

Defunct motor vehicle manufacturers of England
Cars introduced in 1963
Bertone vehicles
Grand tourers
Sports car manufacturers